Chuckatuck Historic District is a national historic district located at Chuckatuck, Suffolk, Virginia. The district encompasses 51 contributing buildings and 2 contributing structures in the crossroads community of Chuckatuck in Suffolk. The district includes dwellings in a variety of popular 19th and early-20th century architectural styles including Federal, Queen Anne, and Bungalow.  Notable buildings include the Saunders House (1780-1820), Howell House, Cannon House, Wesley Chapel United Methodist Church (1893), W. C. Moore House, and the Gwaltney Store. Located in the district is the separately listed Godwin–Knight House.

It was added to the National Register of Historic Places in 1995.

References

External links

Historic districts on the National Register of Historic Places in Virginia
Federal architecture in Virginia
Queen Anne architecture in Virginia
Buildings and structures in Suffolk, Virginia
National Register of Historic Places in Suffolk, Virginia
Historic American Buildings Survey in Virginia